Leonard Christopher "Swede" Hanson (March 29, 1900 – October 1969) was a college football player and wrestler and later coach at Cornell University. He was inducted into the Cornell Athletics Hall of Fame in 1980.

Playing career

Football
Hanson was a prominent tackle for the Cornell Big Red football team.  He also kicked.

1921

Norman E. Brown of the Central Press selected Hanson for All-American.

Coaching career
He assisted Gil Dobie at his alma mater.

References

American football tackles
Cornell Big Red football players
Cornell Big Red football coaches
Cornell Big Red wrestlers
Players of American football from South Dakota
1900 births
American football placekickers
People from Veblen, South Dakota
All-American college football players
1969 deaths